Antonio Castellanos Basich (born 5 March 1946) is a Mexican sculptor. He is probably best known for his large sculpture of Antonio de Montesinos delivering his sermon at the seafront of Santo Domingo in the Dominican Republic (1982) and the geometrical cubic forms he added to the St. Peter's Basilica in the Vatican (1977).

Career
In 1963-4 he studied drawing at the Escuela Nacional de Artes Plásticas and painting and sculpture at the Instituto Nacional de Bellas Artes, and was apprenticed to his stepfather sculptor Federico Canessi in the 1960s and 1970s. Castellanos and Canessi's projects included the monument at Netzahualcoyotl Dam in Malpaso, Chiapas, the Mahatma Gandhi Monument in Chapultepec, Mexico City, the Salvador Allende monument in Ciudad Sahagún, Hidalgo (1973), and the 7-metre high Father Kino monument (1974) and the General Ignacio Zaragoza equestrian monument (1976) in Tijuana.

In May 1977, Antonio Castellanos, Ricardo Cruz and Fundatier Galindo contributed the geometrical cubic forms in the St. Peter's Basilica in the Vatican. Castellanos is noted for his large sculpture of Antonio de Montesinos delivering his sermon facing the Caribbean sea at the seafront of Santo Domingo in the Dominican Republic. The stone and bronze statue is 15 meters tall and was donated to the Dominican people by the Mexican government and inaugurated in 1982 by the presidents of Mexico and the Dominican Republic. Castellanos is also noted for his "monumental head" of Diego Rivera at the Dolores Olmedo Museum in Mexico City

In 1967 Castellanos was awarded an Award of Honor for his sculpture "Germinación" at the Biennial Museum of Modern Art in Mexico City. Antonio Espinoza stated that he "stands out for his interpretations of femininity and maternity".

References

External links

Official site

Mexican sculptors
Male sculptors
1946 births
Living people
Mexican people of Croatian descent